It's All Too Beautiful is the fourteenth studio album by New Zealand band band, Dragon. The album was recorded live in the studio.

It pays tribute to songs from the British Invasion of the 1960s.

The album was released on 2 February 2011.

Dragon promoted the album with a British Invasion Tour throughout 2011.

On 1 April 2011, the band recorded a "Live at the Linear DVD", which was uploaded onto YouTube in 2014.

Track listing

Personnel
 Todd Hunter – bass, vocals
 Mark Williams – lead vocals, acoustic guitar, keyboards
 Bruce Reid – guitar, vocals 
 Pete Drummond – drums, vocals, mandolin, melodica, keyboards, percussion

References 

Dragon (band) albums
2011 albums
Covers albums